William Ernest Dey (June 4, 1870 – August 20, 1921) was an early amateur ice hockey player for the Ottawa Hockey Club. He was a member of the Dey family of Ottawa, Canada which was successful in boat-building, arenas and ice hockey businesses. He was born in Ottawa.

Playing career 
Dey first joined the senior Ottawa Hockey Club in 1892. He played six seasons with Ottawa HC, retiring after the 1897 season. He died in Ottawa in 1921 after an illness and is buried at Beechwood Cemetery.

See also 
 Ted Dey
 Edgar Dey

References 

 

Ottawa Senators (original) players
Ice hockey people from Ottawa
1870 births
1921 deaths